Epermenia malawica is a moth in the family Epermeniidae. It was described by Reinhard Gaedike in 2004. It is found in Kenya and Malawi.

References

Epermeniidae
Moths described in 2004
Lepidoptera of Kenya
Lepidoptera of Malawi
Moths of Sub-Saharan Africa